Travis Ranch is a census-designated place (CDP) in Kaufman County, Texas, United States. Its population was 2,556 at the 2010 census. It is part of the Dallas–Fort Worth–Arlington metropolitan area.

It is bordered to the north by the city of Heath. The northwest corner of the town abuts Lake Ray Hubbard on the East Fork Trinity River.

References

Dallas–Fort Worth metroplex
Census-designated places in Texas
Census-designated places in Kaufman County, Texas